"I Don't" is a debut song co-written and recorded by American country music artist Danielle Peck.  It was released in September 2005 as the first single from the album Danielle Peck.  The song reached #28 on the Billboard Hot Country Songs chart.  The song was written by Peck, Burton Banks Collins and Clay Mills.

Chart performance

References

2005 debut singles
2005 songs
Danielle Peck songs
Songs written by Clay Mills
Song recordings produced by Byron Gallimore
Big Machine Records singles